Horse is a 1965 underground film directed by Andy Warhol, written by Ronald Tavel, and starring Edie Sedgwick, Gregory Battcock, Tosh Carillo, Ondine, Norman Glick, Daniel Cassidy Jr., and Larry Latrae (Latreille). Warhol makes a cameo.

A photo from Horse published in Parker Tyler's book Underground Film (Grove Press, 1969; reprint DaCapo Press, 1995) shows all the male performers dressed only in jockstraps.

Plot
The main event is a strip poker game in which an outlaw, his sheriff captor, and a pal join. The game ends with the outlaw (Tosh Carrillo) getting beaten up by the others for cheating. At one point, one of the men sits on the real horse (a stallion) hired for the day by Warhol.

See also
List of American films of 1965
Andy Warhol filmography

References

External links
Horse at IMDB
Horse at WarholStars

1965 films
1965 LGBT-related films
Films directed by Andy Warhol
American independent films
1960s English-language films
1960s American films